Mark Vincent Parkinson (born June 24, 1957) is an American businessman and former politician serving as head of the American Health Care Association (AHCA) and National Center for Assisted Living (NCAL). He served as the 47th lieutenant governor of Kansas from 2007 to 2009 and the 45th governor of Kansas from 2009 until 2011. He was also a state legislator.

Early life, family, education, and career
Parkinson was born in 1957 in Wichita, Kansas, to a family with roots in Scott City, where Parkinson still owns a farm. Parkinson’s father, Hank, worked in advertising, public relations and political consulting. He married his wife Stacy (née Abbott) in 1983. They have three children.

Parkinson graduated from Wichita Heights High School. In 1980, he graduated summa cum laude from Wichita State University. In 1984, he graduated first in his class at the University of Kansas Law School. Parkinson won the national moot court championship during law school.

Parkinson immediately entered private practice after graduation. He was a founding partner of Parkinson, Foth & Orrick in 1986. In 1996, Parkinson left his law practice to develop elder care facilities in Kansas and Missouri. His wife was an attorney. In 2006, Parkinson and his wife sold two care facilities in Shawnee.

Kansas Legislature 
Parkinson served in the Kansas House of Representatives from 1991 to 1993. He served in the Kansas Senate from 1993 to 1997. The districts he represented included Olathe, Kansas. During his time in the legislature, he helped write the state’s death penalty law. He also wrote legislation to facilitate the consolidation of the Wyandotte County government. He stood out for opposing a bill that would have banned flag burning. Parkinson declined to run for reelection to the state senate in 1996.

From 1999 to 2003, he was chairman of the Kansas Republican Party. He secured this role in part from the support of Governor William Graves. In 2004, he served as chairman of the Shawnee Area Chamber of Commerce, and in 2005, served as the "Chair of the Chairs" of the six chambers of commerce in Johnson County.

Lieutenant Governor of Kansas 
In May 2006, Governor Kathleen Sebelius announced that Parkinson had switched parties and was her running mate for her reelection campaign, succeeding retiring Lieutenant Governor John E. Moore, also a former Republican who had switched parties shortly before he joined a ticket with Sebelius. Parkinson's business experience and track record of working with both Republicans and Democrats were the reasons Sebelius stated for choosing him.

As lieutenant governor, Parkinson focused a significant amount of time on energy issues. He served as co-chairman of the Kansas Energy Council. He also served on the Wind Working Group. In 2008, Parkinson participated in a delegation of lieutenant governors on a trade mission to China. As chairman of the American Recovery and Reinvestment Act Advisory Group, Parkinson helped decide how to spend federal stimulus funds allocated to Kansas.

Governor of Kansas 
In March 2009, President Barack Obama announced that Sebelius as his nominee for United States Secretary of Health and Human Services. Sebelius resigned as governor of Kansas following her confirmation on April 28, 2009; Parkinson was sworn in as governor the same day. Parkinson stated he would not be a candidate in the 2010 election and was succeeded by Sam Brownback.

During his time as governor, Parkinson had to implement spending cuts and tax increases in order to manage a budget deficit. Under his leadership, the state developed a comprehensive energy policy including net metering, and a 10-year plan for maintaining transportation infrastructure. Parkinson implemented a smoking ban that included public places; taxicabs and limousines; common areas in public and private buildings, condominiums and other multiple-residential facilities and entries to most buildings.  

Parkinson opposed moving detainees from Guantanamo Bay. Parkinson signed legislation to create a private cause of action for victims of child pornography. Parkinson lobbied the governors of Missouri and Nebraska to preserve the Big 12 Conference. He led a trade mission to Taiwan and another to mainland China.

Citing his bipartisan support and ability to move the state forward in challenging economic times, The Topeka Capital-Journal named Parkinson "Kansan of the Year" in 2009. In late 2010, Parkinson was honored by Kansas Advocates for Better Care for his work in elder care. Parkinson received the organization's second annual Caring Award, which is given to recognize exemplary contributions of leadership in providing quality care for frail elders and persons with disabilities in Kansas.

Post-political career
Parkinson and his wife, Stacy, have been involved in several campaigns to benefit non-profit and public organizations. The Parkinsons led a $4.29 million fundraising campaign for Sunflower House in 2002. They led another fundraising drive for SAFEHOME in 2005. Together with two other couples, the Parkinsons co-chaired the University of Kansas’ fundraising efforts from 2012 to 2016. $1.5 billion was raised under their leadership. 

As of 2020, Parkinson is president and chief executive officer of the American Health Care Association (AHCA) and National Center for Assisted Living. (NCAL) The group represented about 9,000 facilities when Parkinson joined the association. Parkinson helped heal a major rift in the AHCA/NCAL and brought numerous providers who left to form their own association back into the fold. As of 2020, AHCA/NCAL has about 14,000 members. 

As president and CEO of AHCA/NCAL, Parkinson was recognized by CEO Update as a “Top Association CEO” of 2013. He was named to Modern Healthcare’s “100 Most Influential People in Healthcare in 2015 and 2020. Parkinson has been recognized as a “Top Lobbyist” by The Hill in 2013, 2014, 2015, 2016, 2017, 2018, 2019, and 2020.

Electoral history

References

External links
Office of the Governor Mark Parkinson (archived)
Kansan of the Year December 26, 2009

Publications concerning Kansas Governor Parkinson's administration available via the KGI Online Library

|-

|-

1957 births
American lawyers
Methodists from Kansas
Governors of Kansas
Kansas Democrats
Kansas state senators
Lieutenant Governors of Kansas
Living people
Members of the Kansas House of Representatives
Politicians from Wichita, Kansas
State political party chairs of Kansas
University of Kansas alumni
Kansas Republicans
Democratic Party governors of Kansas